Special Field Orders No. 67 (series 1864) were military orders issued during the American Civil War, on September 14, 1864, by General William Tecumseh Sherman, commander of the Military Division of the Mississippi of the United States Army. The order stated that "The city of Atlanta, being exclusively required for warlike purposes, will at once be vacated by all except the armies of the United States". The order also instructs the chief engineer to survey the city for the permanent defense and to mark all structures that stand in his way to be set apart for destruction. The order also prohibited soldiers from occupying any house. The order allowed soldiers to "use boards, shingles, or materials of buildings, barns, sheds, warehouses, and shanties" to build their own quarters.

Impact of the Order

This order specified that all civilians had to leave Atlanta. Lieut. Col. Le Duc was in charge of issuing travel permits to the citizens that were evacuating Atlanta to the South. Between September 10 and September 20, Col. Le Duc registered 1,651 individuals. There were 705 adults, 860 children and 86 servants. Together they all they carried 8,842 packages of baggage.

Section 3 of the order directed the chief engineer, Capt. Orlando M. Poe to construct new defensive works around Atlanta. In addition to digging trenches and constructing gun emplacements, Poe's men also had to cut down trees and tear down building to make way for the fortifications and to clear lines of fire in case the confederates attacked to recapture the city of Atlanta. One building of note that was taken down was the three story brick Atlanta Female Institute located on Ellis Street.

Section 4 of the order did not allow the troops to occupy homes within Atlanta. In accordance with this order the troops constructed their own lodgings for their stay. They obtained building material by tearing up fences, home's, and even removing the bricks from chimneys. The order applied to all federal troops south of Chattanooga (section 6). This resulted in troops in towns other than Atlanta deconstructing private home to build shelters for themselves.

Orders

Publication in the Official Record
This order is part of the Official Records of the American Civil War. It can be found in Series I — Military Operations, Volume XXXVI, Part V, Page 308. The volume was published in 1891.

See also
 Atlanta Campaign
 Atlanta in the American Civil War

References

Citations

General orders
American Civil War documents
Georgia (U.S. state) in the American Civil War
1864 documents